The 2011 Belgian GP2 round was a GP2 Series motor race held on August 27 and 28, 2011 at Circuit de Spa-Francorchamps, Belgium. It was the eighth round of the 2011 GP2 season. The race supported the 2011 Belgian Grand Prix.

Romain Grosjean secured the 2011 GP2 Series championship with a third place in the feature race when title rival Giedo van der Garde crashed out.

Classification

Qualifying

Notes
 – Pic was excluded from the results of the qualifying session because his car did not comply with the technical regulations, having insufficient fuel available for the scrutineering.
 – Valsecchi was given a ten place grid penalty for Feature Race after setting his fastest sector time under yellow flags during the qualifying session.

Feature Race

Notes
 – Fauzy and Král had their finishing positions swapped after post-race investigations: Fauzy passed the Czech driver behind the safety car but was ordered to let Král through. Then the stewards determined that the Malaysian was within his rights to pass Král, because the Czech had slowed too much, so they switched their positions.

Sprint Race

Standings after the round

Drivers' Championship standings

Teams' Championship standings

 Note: Only the top five positions are included for both sets of standings.

See also 
 2011 Belgian Grand Prix
 2011 Spa-Francorchamps GP3 Series round

References

External links
GP2 Series official website: Results

Spa
GP2 Spa